Gabriel Robert Gauthier (born January 20, 1984) is an American former professional ice hockey forward who is currently the head coach of the Las Vegas Storm in the Western States Hockey League. He  played eight games in the NHL with the Los Angeles Kings.

Playing career
As a youth, Gauthier played in the 1998 Quebec International Pee-Wee Hockey Tournament with the Los Angeles Junior Kings minor ice hockey team.

Gauthier played Tier II Junior hockey with the Chilliwack Chiefs of the British Columbia Hockey League from 1999 until 2002. He then entered university with the University of Denver, where he played four seasons helping the Pioneers win two consecutive NCAA Championships in 2004 and 2005. After graduation, he was signed as a free agent to a two-year contract by the Kings in 2006. He has played for the Kings organization, mostly for the Manchester Monarchs of the American Hockey League (AHL), including being selected as the team man of the year in his first season, but he periodically played in the NHL; he appeared in 5 games with the Kings in 2006–07 and 3 games in 2007–08.

After an injury stricken 2010–11 season split between the Victoria Salmon Kings of the ECHL and the Syracuse Crunch of the AHL, Gauthier left North America to sign with Augsburger Panther of the Deutsche Eishockey Liga (DEL) on a one-year contract on July 15, 2011. In the 2011–12 season, Gauthier struggled to adjust in his return from injury, scoring only 10 points in 44 contests.

Looking for a fresh start, Gauthier returned to the state of Colorado and signed a one-year deal with the Colorado Eagles of the ECHL on July 8, 2012. To start the 2012–13 season, he appeared in only 3 games with the Eagles before he was mutually released. After earlier considering to play minor hockey in Colorado with the inaugural Denver Cutthroats of the Central Hockey League (CHL), Gauthier was signed and reunited with former Kings teammate and Cutthroats head coach Derek Armstrong on October 30, 2012.

Career statistics

Awards and honors

References

External links

1984 births
Living people
Augsburger Panther players
Colorado Eagles players
Denver Cutthroats players
Denver Pioneers men's ice hockey players
Ice hockey people from California
Los Angeles Kings players
Manchester Monarchs (AHL) players
Sportspeople from Orange County, California
Sportspeople from Torrance, California
Syracuse Crunch players
Undrafted National Hockey League players
Victoria Salmon Kings players
People from Buena Park, California
American men's ice hockey centers
Ice hockey players from California
AHCA Division I men's ice hockey All-Americans
NCAA men's ice hockey national champions